Donna Michelle Ronne (née Fick; December 8, 1945 – April 9, 2004) was an American model, actress, and photographer.  Known professionally as Donna Michelle, she was Playboy magazine's December 1963 Playmate of the Month and 1964 Playmate of the Year.  Pompeo Posar and Edmund Leja photographed her centerfold images.

Personal life
The maiden name of Michelle's mother was Baron.  On February 9, 1963, Michelle married David M. Ronne in Los Angeles; they divorced in April 1967.  Michelle was seventeen years old and married when she was named Playmate of the Month.

Michelle died of a heart attack in Ukiah, California, at the age of 58.

Filmography 
 Company of Killers (1971) .... Gloria
 Le Bal des voyous (1968) .... Karine
 La Nuit la plus chaude (1967)
 I Spy (TV) – "Lori" (1966) .... Millicent
 One Spy Too Many (1966) .... Princess Nicole
 The Big Valley (TV) – "Barbary Red" (1966) .... Dolly
 Agent for H.A.R.M. (1966) .... Marian
 Mickey One (1965) .... The Girl
 Beach Blanket Bingo (1965) .... Animal
 Goodbye Charlie (1964) .... Guest on yacht doing the Twist
 The Man from U.N.C.L.E. (TV) – "The Double Affair" (1964) (released as a film called The Spy with My Face) .... Nina

See also
 List of people in Playboy 1960–1969

References

External links
 
 

American film actresses
20th-century American photographers
1960s Playboy Playmates
Playboy Playmates of the Year
Actresses from Los Angeles
1945 births
2004 deaths
20th-century American actresses
21st-century American actresses
20th-century American women photographers
21st-century American women photographers
21st-century American photographers